Laurent Daignault (born October 30, 1968) is a Canadian short track speed skater who competed in the 1992 Winter Olympics.

He was born in Montreal, Quebec and is the younger brother of Michel Daignault.

In 1992 he was a member of the Canadian relay team which won the silver medal in the 5000 metre relay competition.

External links
 profile

1968 births
Living people
Canadian male short track speed skaters
Olympic short track speed skaters of Canada
Short track speed skaters at the 1992 Winter Olympics
Olympic silver medalists for Canada
Olympic medalists in short track speed skating
Medalists at the 1992 Winter Olympics
Speed skaters from Montreal
20th-century Canadian people